This is a list of high schools in the U.S. state of Illinois.

Adams County
Central High School, Camp Point
Liberty High School, Liberty
Payson-Seymour High School, Payson
Unity High School, Mendon

Quincy
Quincy Notre Dame High School
Quincy Senior High School

Alexander County
Cairo Junior/Senior High School, Cairo
Egyptian Senior High School, Tamms

Bond County
Greenville High School, Greenville
Mulberry Grove High School, Mulberry Grove

Boone County
North Boone High School, Poplar Grove

Belvidere
Belvidere High School
Belvidere North High School

Brown County
Brown County High School, Mount Sterling

Bureau County
Bureau Valley High School, Manlius
DePue High School, DePue
Hall High School, Spring Valley
La Moille High School, La Moille
Ohio High School, Ohio
Princeton High School, Princeton

Calhoun County
Brussels High School, Brussels
Calhoun High School, Hardin

Carroll County
Eastland High School, Lanark
Milledgeville High School, Milledgeville
West Carroll High School, Savanna

Cass County
A-C Central High School, Ashland
Beardstown High School, Beardstown
Virginia Senior High School, Virginia

Champaign County
Fisher Junior/Senior High School, Fisher
Heritage High School, Broadlands
Mahomet-Seymour High School, Mahomet
Rantoul Township High School , Rantoul
St. Joseph-Ogden High School, St. Joseph
Unity High School, Tolono

Champaign
Centennial High School
Champaign Central High School
Judah Christian School
St. Thomas More High School

Urbana
University Laboratory High School
Urbana High School

Christian County
Edinburg High School, Edinburg
Morrisonville High School, Morrisonville
Pana Senior High School, Pana
South Fork Jr/Sr High School (6–12), Kincaid
Taylorville High School, Taylorville

Clark County
Casey-Westfield High School, Casey
Marshall High School, Marshall
Martinsville High School, Martinsville

Clay County
Clay City High School, Clay City
Flora High School, Flora
North Clay High School, Louisville

Clinton County
Carlyle High School, Carlyle
Christ Our Rock Lutheran High School, Centralia
Wesclin Senior High School, Trenton

Breese
Central Community High School
Mater Dei High School

Coles County
Charleston High School, Charleston
Mattoon High School, Mattoon
Oakland High School, Oakland

Cook County

Argo Community High School, Summit
Bremen High School, Midlothian
Buffalo Grove High School, Buffalo Grove
Christian Heritage Academy, Northfield
East Leyden High School, Franklin Park
Dwight D. Eisenhower High School, Blue Island
Elgin High School, Elgin
Elk Grove High School, Elk Grove Village
Elmwood Park High School, Elmwood Park
Evergreen Park Community High School, Evergreen Park
Glenbrook North High School, Northbrook
Glenbrook South High School, Glenview
Guerin College Preparatory High School, River Grove
Hillcrest High School, Country Club Hills
Homewood-Flossmoor High School, Flossmoor
Lemont High School, Lemont
Lyons Township High School, La Grange
J. Sterling Morton High School District 201, a district in Cicero and Berwyn that competes athletically as "Morton High School", comprising the following campuses:
J. Sterling Morton High School East, Cicero
J. Sterling Morton Freshman Center, Cicero
J. Sterling Morton High School West, Berwyn
Muslim Community Center Academy, Morton Grove
Oak Forest High School, Oak Forest
Oak Park and River Forest High School, Oak Park
Prospect High School, Mount Prospect
Proviso East High School, Maywood
Proviso Mathematics and Science Academy, Forest Park
Proviso West High School, Hillside
Rich Central High School, Olympia Fields
Rich East High School, Park Forest
Ridgewood High School, Norridge
Riverside Brookfield High School, Riverside
Rochelle Zell Jewish High School, Deerfield
Rolling Meadows High School, Rolling Meadows
Carl Sandburg High School, Orland Park
Schaumburg High School, Schaumburg
Amos Alonzo Stagg High School, Palos Hills
Streamwood High School, Streamwood
Thornridge High School, Dolton
Thornton Fractional North High School, Calumet City
Thornton Township High School, Harvey
Thornwood High School, South Holland
Walther Christian Academy, Melrose Park
West Leyden High School, Northlake
Wheeling High School, Wheeling

Arlington Heights

Christian Liberty Academy
John Hersey High School
Vanguard School

Bridgeview
Aqsa School
Universal School

Burbank
Queen of Peace High School
Reavis High School

Chicago Public Schools

Al Raby School for Community and Environment
Amundsen High School
Austin Community Academy High School
Bogan High School
Bowen High School
Bronzeville Scholastic Institute
Carl Schurz High School
Carver Military Academy
Chicago High School for Agricultural Sciences
Chicago High School for the Arts
Chicago Math and Science Academy
Chicago Military Academy
Chicago Technology Academy
Chicago Vocational High School
Corliss High School
Crane High School
Curie Metropolitan High School
Disney II Magnet School
Dr. Pedro Albizu Campos High School
Dunbar Vocational High School
DuSable High School
Dyett High School
Farragut Career Academy
Fenger Academy High School
Foreman High School
Frederick Douglass Academy High School
Gage Park High School
George Washington High School
George Westinghouse College Prep
Goode STEM Academy
Gwendolyn Brooks College Preparatory Academy
Harlan Community Academy High School
Hirsch Metropolitan High School
Hubbard High School
Hyde Park Academy High School
Infinity Math, Science & Technology High School
John F. Kennedy High School
John Hancock College Preparatory High School
Jones College Prep High School
Juarez Community Academy
Julian High School
Kelly High School
Kelvyn Park High School
Kenwood Academy
King College Prep
Lake View High School
Lane Tech College Prep High School
Lincoln Park High School
Little Village Lawndale High School Campus
Manley Career Academy High School
Marshall Metropolitan High School
Mather High School
Michele Clark Magnet High School
Morgan Park High School
Noble Street College Prep
North-Grand High School
Northside College Preparatory High School
Northside Learning Center High School
Ogden International High School
Orr Academy High School
Phoenix Military Academy
Prosser Career Academy
Ray Graham Training Center
Richards Career Academy
Robert Lindblom Math & Science Academy
Roberto Clemente Community Academy
Roosevelt High School
Senn High School
Simeon Career Academy
South Shore High School
Steinmetz College Prep
Sullivan High School
Taft High School
Tilden High School
Uplift Community High School
Vaughn Occupational High School
Von Steuben Metropolitan High School
Walter Payton College Prep
Wells Community Academy High School
Wendell Phillips Academy High School
Whitney M. Young Magnet High School
York Alternative High School

Chicago Independent Schools

Air Force Academy High School
Antonia Pantoja Charter School
Back of the Yards College Preparatory High School
British International School of Chicago Lincoln Park
British International School of Chicago, South Loop
Chicago Academy for the Arts
Chicago Academy High School
Chicago International Charter School Northtown Academy
Chicago Waldorf School
Collins Academy High School
Devry Advantage Academy
Francis W. Parker School
Hales Franciscan High School
John Hope College Preparatory High School
Latin School of Chicago
Latino Youth High School
Lubavitch Girls High School
Lubavitch Mesivta of Chicago
Lycée Français de Chicago
Morgan Park Academy
Muhammad University of Islam
North Lawndale College Prep High School
Providence St. Mel School
St. Benedict High School
Southside Occupational Academy
Telshe High School
University of Chicago Laboratory Schools, Chicago
Urban Prep Charter Academy for Young Men
West Town Academy

Archdiocese of Chicago (Chicago/Cook County)

Brother Rice High School
Christ the King Jesuit College Prep High School
Cristo Rey Jesuit High School
De La Salle Institute
DePaul College Prep
Fenwick High School (Oak Park, Illinois)
Holy Trinity High School
Josephinum Academy
Leo Catholic High School
Loyola Academy, Willmette
Marian Catholic High School, Chicago Heights
Marist High School
Mother McAuley Liberal Arts High School
Mount Carmel High School
Nazareth Academy (La Grange Park, Illinois)
Our Lady of Tepeyac High School
Regina Dominican High School, Willmette
Resurrection High School
St. Ignatius College Prep
St. Patrick High School
St. Rita of Cascia High School
St. Francis de Sales High School
St. Laurence High School, Burbank
St. Viator High School, Arlington Heights
Trinity High School (River Forest, Illinois)

Chicago Heights

Bloom High School
Bloom Trail High School

Des Plaines
Maine West High School
North Cook Young Adult Academy
The Willows Academy

Evanston
Beacon Academy
Evanston Township High School
Roycemore School

Hoffman Estates
James B. Conant High School
Hoffman Estates High School

Lansing
Illiana Christian High School
Thornton Fractional South High School

Niles
Northridge Preparatory School
Notre Dame College Prep

Oak Lawn
Oak Lawn Community High School
Harold L. Richards High School
South Side Baptist School

Palatine
William Fremd High School
Palatine High School
St. Thomas of Villanova Catholic School

Palos Heights
Alan B. Shepard High School
Chicago Christian High School

Park Ridge
Maine East High School
Maine South High School

Richton Park
Rich South High School
Southland College Preparatory Charter High School

Skokie
Fasman Yeshiva High School
Ida Crown Jewish Academy
Niles North High School
Niles West High School

Tinley Park
Victor J. Andrew High School
Tinley Park High School

Winnetka
New Trier High School
North Shore Country Day School

Defunct

Academy of Our Lady (Chicago) (1875-1899)
Archbishop Quigley Preparatory Seminary, Chicago (1918–2007)
Arlington High School, Arlington Heights (1922–1984)
Calumet High School (Chicago) (1919–2006)
Chicago Discovery Academy, Chicago (closed 2013)
Chicago High School, Chicago (1856–1880)
Chicago Talent Development High School, Chicago (2009–2014)
Cooley Vocational High School, Chicago (1958–1979)
Englewood Technical Prep Academy, Chicago (1873–2008)
Flower Career Academy, Chicago (1911–2003)
Forest View High School, Arlington Heights (1962–1986)
Holy Cross High School (River Grove, Illinois) (1961–2004)
Immaculata High School (Chicago) (1921–1981)
Immaculate Heart of Mary High School, Westchester (1960–2005)
Las Casas Occupational High School, Chicago (closed 2011)
Loretto Academy (Chicago) (1906-1972)
Lourdes High School, Chicago
Luther High School North, Chicago (1909-2017)
Luther High School South, Chicago (closed 2014)
Maine North High School, Des Plaines (1970–1981)
Maria High School (Chicago, Illinois) (1911–2013)
McKinley High School (Chicago) (1875–1954)
Mendel Catholic High School, Chicago (1951–1988)
Mount Assisi Academy, Lemont (1951-2014)
Near North Career Metropolitan High School, Chicago (1977–2001)
Niles East High School, Skokie (1938–1980)
Northwest Suburban Academy, Arlington Heights (closed 2009)
Notre Dame High School for Girls, Chicago (1938-2016)
Quigley South, Chicago (1961–1990)
Saint George High School (Evanston, Illinois) (1927–1969)
Seton Academy (South Holland, Illinois) (1963-2016)
St. Gregory the Great High School, Chicago (1937–2014)
St. Joseph High School (Westchester, Illinois) (1960-2021)
Saint Louise de Marillac High School, Northfield (1967–1994)
St. Scholastica Academy (Chicago, Illinois) (1865–2012)
Spalding High School (Chicago) (1908–2004)
Weber High School (Chicago) (1890-1999)
Young Women's Leadership Charter School of Chicago (1999-2019)

Crawford County

Hutsonville High School, Hutsonville
Oblong High School, Oblong
Palestine High School, Palestine
Robinson High School, Robinson

Cumberland County
Cumberland High School, Toledo
Neoga Junior-Senior High School, Neoga

DeKalb County

DeKalb High School, DeKalb
Genoa-Kingston High School, Genoa
Hiawatha Jr/Sr High School, Kirkland
Hinckley-Big Rock High School, Hinckley
Indian Creek High School, Shabbona
Sandwich Community High School, Sandwich, also serves students in Kendall and LaSalle counties
Somonauk High School, Somonauk, also serves students in LaSalle County
Sycamore High School, Sycamore

DeWitt County
Blue Ridge High School, Farmer City
Clinton High School, Clinton

Douglas County

Arcola High School, Arcola
Arthur-Lovington-Atwood-Hammond High School, Arthur
Tuscola Community High School, Tuscola
Villa Grove High School, Villa Grove

DuPage County

Addison Trail High School, Addison
Bartlett High School, Bartlett
Fenton High School, Bensenville
Glenbard North High School, Carol Stream
Hinsdale Central High School, Hinsdale
Hinsdale South High School, Darien
Lake Park High School, Roselle
Westmont High School, Westmont

Aurora
Metea Valley High School
Waubonsie Valley High School

Downers Grove
Downers Grove North High School
Downers Grove South High School

Elmhurst
IC Catholic Prep
Timothy Christian School
York Community High School

Glen Ellyn
Glenbard South High School
Glenbard West High School

Lisle
Benet Academy
Lisle High School

Lombard
College Preparatory School of America
Glenbard East High School
Montini Catholic High School

Naperville
Naperville Central High School
Naperville North High School

Villa Park
Islamic Foundation School
Willowbrook High School

Wheaton
St. Francis High School
Wheaton North High School
Wheaton Warrenville South High School

West Chicago
West Chicago Community High School
Wheaton Academy

Defunct
Driscoll Catholic High School, Addison (1966–2009)
Indian Plains Alternative High School, Aurora (closed 2018)
Midwest Military Academy, Wheaton (1931-1988)

Edgar County

Chrisman High School, Chrisman
Kansas High School, Kansas
Paris Cooperative High School, Paris
Shiloh High School, Hume

Edwards County
Edwards County High School, Albion

Effingham County

Altamont High School, Altamont
Beecher City Jr/Sr High School, Beecher City
Dieterich Jr/Sr High School, Dieterich
Teutopolis High School, Teutopolis

Effingham
Effingham High School
St. Anthony High School

Fayette County

Brownstown Jr/Sr High School, Brownstown
Ramsey High School, Ramsey
St. Elmo Jr/Sr High School, St. Elmo
Vandalia Community High School, Vandalia

Ford County
Gibson City-Melvin-Sibley High School, Gibson City
Paxton-Buckley-Loda High School, Paxton

Franklin County

Benton Consolidated High School, Benton
Christopher High School, Christopher
Frankfort Community High School, West Frankfort
Sesser-Valier High School, Sesser
Thompsonville High School, Thompsonville
Zeigler-Royalton High School, Zeigler

Fulton County

Astoria High School, Astoria
Avon High School, Avon
Canton High School, Canton
Cuba High School, Cuba
Farmington Central High School, Farmington
Lewistown High School, Lewistown
Spoon River Valley High School, London Mills
VIT High School, Table Grove

Gallatin County
Gallatin High School, Junction

Greene County
Carrollton High School, Carrollton
Greenfield High School, Greenfield
North Greene High School, White Hall

Grundy County

Coal City High School, Coal City
Gardner-South Wilmington High School, Gardner
Minooka High School, Minooka
Morris Community High School, Morris

Hamilton County
Hamilton County Jr/Sr High School, McLeansboro

Hancock County

Hamilton High School, Hamilton
Illini West High School, Carthage
Southeastern High School, Augusta
Warsaw High School, Warsaw

Hardin County
Hardin County High School, Elizabethtown

Henderson County
West Central High School, Biggsville

Henry County

AlWood High School, Woodhull
Annawan High School, Annawan
Cambridge High School, Cambridge
Galva High School, Galva
Geneseo High School, Geneseo
Orion High School, Orion

Kewanee
Kewanee High School
Wethersfield High School

Iroquois County

Central High School, Clifton
Christ Lutheran High School, Buckley
Cissna Park High School, Cissna Park
Donovan Jr/Sr High School, Donovan
Iroquois West High School, Gilman
Milford High School, Milford
Watseka Community High School, Watseka

Defunct
Crescent-Iroquois High School, Crescent City (1940–2009)

Jackson County
Elverado High School, Elkville
Murphysboro High School, Murphysboro
Trico High School, Campbell Hill

Carbondale
Brehm Preparatory School
Carbondale Community High School

Jasper County
Newton Community High School, Newton

Jefferson County

Mount Vernon Township High School, Mount Vernon
Waltonville High School, Waltonville
Webber High School, Bluford
Woodlawn Community High School, Woodlawn

Jersey County
Jersey Community High School, Jerseyville

Jo Daviess County

East Dubuque High School, East Dubuque
Galena High School, Galena
River Ridge High School, Hanover
Scales Mound High School, Scales Mound
Stockton High School, Stockton
Warren High School, Warren

Johnson County
Goreville High School, Goreville
Vienna High School, Vienna

Kane County

Batavia High School, Batavia
Central High School, Burlington
Dundee-Crown High School, Carpentersville
Geneva Community High School, Geneva
Hampshire High School, Hampshire
Kaneland High School, Maple Park
South Elgin High School, South Elgin

Aurora

Aurora Central Catholic High School
Aurora Christian Schools
East Aurora High School
Illinois Mathematics and Science Academy
Marmion Academy
Rosary High School
West Aurora High School

Elgin

The Einstein Academy
Elgin Academy
Harvest Christian Academy
Larkin High School
St. Edward Central Catholic High School
Westminster Christian School

St. Charles

St. Charles East High School
St. Charles North High School

Defunct
Academy of the Cross, St. Charles (never opened, property sold in 2015)
Broadview Academy, La Fox (1909–May 2007)

Kankakee County

Bradley-Bourbonnais Community High School, Bradley
Grant Park High School, Grant Park
Herscher High School, Herscher
Manteno High School, Manteno
Momence High School, Momence
St. Anne Community High School, St. Anne

Kankakee

Bishop McNamara High School
Grace Christian Academy
Kankakee High School
Kankakee Trinity Academy

Kendall County

Newark Community High School, Newark
Plainfield South High School, Joliet
Plano High School, Plano
Yorkville High School, Yorkville

Oswego
Oswego East High School
Oswego High School

Knox County

Abingdon-Avon High School, Abingdon
Galesburg High School, Galesburg
Knoxville High School, Knoxville
ROWVA High School, Oneida
Williamsfield High School, Williamsfield

LaSalle County

Earlville High School, Earlville
LaSalle-Peru High School, LaSalle
Leland High School, Leland
Mendota Township High School, Mendota
St. Bede Academy, Peru
Seneca High School, Seneca
Serena High School, Serena
Streator Township High School, Streator

Ottawa
Marquette Academy
Ottawa Township High School

Lake County

Antioch Community High School, Antioch
Barrington High School, Barrington
Deerfield High School, Deerfield
Grant Community High School, Fox Lake
Highland Park High School, Highland Park
Lake Zurich High School, Lake Zurich
Lakes Community High School, Lake Villa
Cyd Lash Academy, Gages Lake
Libertyville High School, Libertyville
North Chicago Community High School, North Chicago
Round Lake High School, Round Lake
Adlai E. Stevenson High School, Lincolnshire
Vernon Hills High School, Vernon Hills
Warren Township High School, Gurnee
Wauconda High School, Wauconda

Grayslake
Grayslake Central High School
Grayslake North High School

Lake Forest
Lake Forest Academy
Lake Forest High School
Woodlands Academy of the Sacred Heart

Mundelein
Carmel High School
Mundelein High School

Waukegan
Cristo Rey St. Martin College Prep
Waukegan High School

Zion
New Tech High at Zion-Benton East
Zion-Benton Township High School

Defunct
Ferry Hall School, Lake Forest (1869–1974)

Lawrence County
Lawrenceville High School, Lawrenceville
Red Hill High School, Bridgeport

Lee County

Amboy High School, Amboy
Ashton-Franklin Center High School, Ashton
Dixon High School, Dixon
Paw Paw High School, Paw Paw

Livingston County

Dwight High School, Dwight
Flanagan-Cornell High School, Flanagan
Pontiac Township High School, Pontiac
Prairie Central High School, Fairbury
Tri-Point High School, Cullom
Woodland High School, Streator, also serves students in LaSalle County

Logan County
Lincoln Community High School, Lincoln
Hartsburg-Embden Jr/Sr High School, Hartsburg
Mount Pulaski High School, Mount Pulaski

Macon County

Argenta-Oreana High School, Argenta
Decatur Christian School, Forsyth
Maroa-Forsyth High School, Maroa
Meridian High School, Macon
Mount Zion High School, Mount Zion
Sangamon Valley High School, Niantic
Warrensburg-Latham High School, Warrensburg

Decatur

Eisenhower High School
Lutheran School Association Decatur
MacArthur High School
St. Teresa High School

Defunct
Stephen Decatur High School, Decatur (1911–2000)

Macoupin County

Bunker Hill High School, Bunker Hill
Carlinville High School, Carlinville
Gillespie High School, Gillespie
Mount Olive High School, Mount Olive
North Mac High School, Virden
Northwestern High School, Palmyra
Southwestern High School, Piasa
Staunton High School, Staunton

Madison County

Civic Memorial High School, Bethalto
Collinsville High School, Collinsville
East Alton-Wood River High School, Wood River
Father McGivney Catholic High School, Maryville
Granite City High School, Granite City
Highland High School, Highland
Madison Senior High School, Madison
Roxana High School, Roxana
Triad High School, Troy

Alton
Alton Senior High School
Marquette Catholic High School

Edwardsville
Edwardsville High School
Metro-East Lutheran High School

Defunct
Livingston High School, Livingston (Late 1800s–2004)
Venice High School, Venice (1917–2004)

Marion County

Centralia High School, Centralia
Odin High School, Odin
Patoka Senior High School, Patoka
Salem Community High School, Salem
Sandoval Junior-Senior High School, Sandoval
South Central High School, Farina

Marshall County
Henry-Senachwine High School, Henry
Midland High School, Varna

Mason County
Havana High School, Havana
Illini Central High School, Mason City
Midwest Central High School, Manito

Massac County
Joppa-Maple Grove High School, Joppa
Massac County High School, Metropolis

McDonough County
Bushnell-Prairie City High School, Bushnell
Macomb High School, Macomb
West Prairie High School, Sciota

McHenry County

Alden-Hebron High School, Hebron
Cary-Grove High School, Cary
Harvard High School, Harvard
Huntley High School, Huntley
Jacobs High School, Algonquin
Johnsburg High School, Johnsburg
Marengo Community High School, Marengo
McHenry High School, McHenry
Richmond-Burton Community High School, Richmond

Crystal Lake

Crystal Lake Central High School
Crystal Lake South High School
Prairie Ridge High School

Woodstock

Marian Central Catholic High School
Woodstock High School
Woodstock North High School

McLean County

El Paso-Gridley High School, Gridley
Heyworth High School, Heyworth
LeRoy High School, Le Roy
Lexington High School, Lexington
Olympia High School, Stanford
Ridgeview High School, Colfax
Tri-Valley High School, Downs

Bloomington

Bloomington High School
Central Catholic High School
Cornerstone Christian Academy
Regional Alternative School

Normal

Calvary Christian Academy
Normal Community High School
Normal Community West High School
University High School

Menard County
Athens Senior High School, Athens
Greenview High School, Greenview
Porta High School, Petersburg

Mercer County
Mercer County High School, Aledo

Monroe County
Columbia High School, Columbia
Valmeyer High School, Valmeyer

Waterloo
Gibault Catholic High School
Waterloo High School

Montgomery County

Hillsboro High School, Hillsboro
Lincolnwood High School, Raymond
Litchfield High School, Litchfield
Nokomis High School, Nokomis

Morgan County

Franklin Junior/Senior High School, Franklin
Meredosia-Chambersburg High School, Meredosia
Triopia Jr/Sr High School, Concord
Waverly High School, Waverly

Jacksonville

Illinois School for the Deaf (ISD)
Illinois School for the Visually Impaired (ISVI)
Jacksonville High School
Routt Catholic High School

Moultrie County
Arthur Christian School, Arthur
Okaw Valley High School, Bethany
Sullivan High School, Sullivan

Ogle County

Byron High School, Byron
Forreston High School, Forreston
Oregon High School, Oregon
Polo Community High School, Polo
Rochelle Township High School, Rochelle
Stillman Valley High School, Stillman Valley

Peoria County

Brimfield High School, Brimfield
Dunlap High School, Dunlap
Elmwood High School, Elmwood
Illini Bluffs High School, Glasford
Illinois Valley Central High School, Chillicothe
Limestone Community High School, Bartonville
Peoria Heights High School, Peoria Heights
Princeville High School, Princeville

Peoria

Manual High School
Peoria Christian School
Peoria High School (Central)
Peoria Notre Dame High School
Richwoods High School
Woodruff Career and Technical Center

Defunct
Academy of Our Lady/Spalding Institute, Peoria (1863–1988)
Bergan High School, Peoria (1964–1988)

Perry County
DuQuoin High School, Du Quoin
Pinckneyville Community High School, Pinckneyville

Piatt County

Bement High School, Bement
Cerro Gordo High School, Cerro Gordo
DeLand-Weldon High School, De Land
Monticello High School, Monticello

Pike County

Griggsville-Perry High School, Griggsville
Pittsfield High School, Pittsfield
Pleasant Hill High School, Pleasant Hill
Western High School, Barry

Pope County
Pope County High School, Golconda

Pulaski County
Century High School, Ullin
Meridian High School, Mounds

Putnam County
Putnam County High School, Granville

Randolph County

Chester High School, Chester
Coulterville High School, Coulterville
Red Bud High School, Red Bud
Sparta High School, Sparta
Steeleville High School, Steeleville

Richland County
Richland County High School, Olney

Rock Island County

 Alleman High School, Rock Island
 Moline High School, Moline
 Riverdale High School, Port Byron
 Rock Island High School, Rock Island
 Rockridge High School, Taylor Ridge
 Sherrard High School, Sherrard (also serves students in Mercer County)
 United Township High School, East Moline

St. Clair County

Berean Christian School, Fairview Heights
Cahokia High School, Cahokia Heights
Collinsville High School, Collinsville
Dupo High School, Dupo
Freeburg Community High School, Freeburg
Lebanon High School, Lebanon
Marissa Jr/Sr High School, Marissa
Mascoutah Community High School, Mascoutah
New Athens High School, New Athens
O'Fallon Township High School, O'Fallon

Belleville

Althoff Catholic High School
Belleville High School-East
Belleville High School-West

East St. Louis

East St. Louis Senior High School
SIUE East St. Louis Charter High School

Saline County

Carrier Mills-Stonefort High School, Carrier Mills
Eldorado High School, Eldorado
Galatia High School, Galatia
Harrisburg High School, Harrisburg

Sangamon County

Auburn High School, Auburn
Glenwood High School, Chatham
New Berlin High School, New Berlin
Pawnee High School, Pawnee
Pleasant Plains High School, Pleasant Plains
Riverton High School, Riverton
Rochester High School, Rochester
Tri-City High School, Buffalo
Williamsville High School, Williamsville

Springfield

Calvary Academy
Douglas/Prep High School
Lanphier High School
Lutheran High School
Sacred Heart-Griffin High School
Springfield High School
Springfield Southeast High School

Defunct
Divernon High School, Divernon (c. 1900–2007)
Ursuline Academy, Springfield (1857–2007)

Schuyler County
Rushville-Industry High School, Rushville

Scott County
Bluffs High School, Bluffs
Winchester High School, Winchester

Shelby County

Central A&M High School, Moweaqua
Cowden-Herrick High School, Cowden
Shelbyville High School, Shelbyville
Stewardson-Strasburg High School, Strasburg
Windsor Jr/Sr High School, Windsor

Stark County
Stark County High School, Toulon

Stephenson County

Dakota Junior Senior High School, Dakota
Lena-Winslow High School, Lena
Orangeville High School, Orangeville
Pearl City High School, Pearl City

Freeport
Aquin Central Catholic High School
Freeport High School

Tazewell County

Deer Creek-Mackinaw High School, Mackinaw
Delavan High School, Delavan
East Peoria Community High School, East Peoria
Morton High School, Morton
Pekin Community High School, Pekin
Tremont High School, Tremont
Washington Community High School, Washington

Union County

Anna-Jonesboro Community High School, Anna
Cobden High School, Cobden
Dongola High School, Dongola
Shawnee High School, Wolf Lake

Vermilion County

Armstrong Township High School, Armstrong
Bismarck Henning High School, Bismarck
Georgetown-Ridge Farm High School, Georgetown
Hoopeston Area High School, Hoopeston
Oakwood High School, Fithian
Salt Fork High School, Catlin
Westville High School, Westville

Danville

Danville High School
First Baptist Christian School
Schlarman Academy

Defunct

Henning High School, Henning (1914–1964)
Catlin High School, Catlin
Jamaica High School, Sidell
Rossville-Alvin High School, Rossville

Wabash County
Mount Carmel High School, Mount Carmel

Warren County
Monmouth-Roseville High School, Monmouth
United Senior High School, Monmouth

Washington County
Nashville Community High School, Nashville
Okawville High School, Okawville

Wayne County
Fairfield Community High School, Fairfield
Wayne City High School, Wayne City

White County
Carmi-White County High School, Carmi
Grayville Jr/Sr High School, Grayville
Norris City-Omaha-Enfield High School, Norris City

Whiteside County

Erie High School, Erie
Fulton High School, Fulton
Morrison High School, Morrison
Newman Central Catholic High School, Sterling
Prophetstown High School, Prophetstown
Rock Falls High School, Rock Falls
Sterling High School, Sterling
Unity Christian High School, Fulton

Will County

Beecher High School, Beecher
Bolingbrook High School
Furqaan Academy, Bolingbrook
Lincoln-Way East High School, Frankfort
Lockport Township High School, Lockport
Neuqua Valley High School, Naperville
Peotone High School, Peotone
Reed-Custer High School, Braidwood
Romeoville High School, Romeoville
Wilmington High School, Wilmington

Crete

Crete-Monee High School
Illinois Lutheran High School

Joliet

Joliet Catholic Academy
Joliet Central High School
Joliet West High School

New Lenox

Lincoln-Way Central High School
Lincoln-Way West High School
Providence Catholic High School

Plainfield

Plainfield Central High School
Plainfield East High School
Plainfield North High School
Plainfield South High School

Defunct 
Christ Lutheran Academy (Plainfield, Illinois) (2001-2010)
 Lincoln-Way North High School, Frankfort (Closed in 2016)

Williamson County
Carterville High School, Carterville
Herrin High School, Herrin

Johnston City
Project E.C.H.O. Alternative School
Johnston City High School

Marion
Crab Orchard High School
Marion High School

Winnebago County

Durand High School, Durand
Harlem High School, Machesney Park
Hononegah Community High School, Rockton
Pecatonica High School, Pecatonica
South Beloit High School, South Beloit
Winnebago High School, Winnebago

Rockford

Auburn High School
Boylan Catholic High School
Christian Life Schools
Guilford High School
Thomas Jefferson High School
Keith Country Day School
Our Lady of the Sacred Heart Academy
Rockford Christian Schools
Rockford East High School
Rockford Lutheran High School

Defunct
Rockford Central High School, Rockford (1885–1940)
St. Thomas Catholic High School for Boys, Rockford (1929-1963)

Woodford County

El Paso-Gridley High School, El Paso
Eureka High School, Eureka
Fieldcrest High School, Minonk
Lowpoint-Washburn High School, Washburn 
Metamora Township High School, Metamora
Roanoke-Benson High School, Roanoke

See also
 List of high schools in Greater St. Louis
 List of school districts in Illinois

References

External links
 List of high schools in Illinois from SchoolTree.org
 List of schools in Illinois from Illinois State Board of Education
 Ryan Janna Huang, seniors at palatine High School in Illinois scored a perfect 36 on their ACT

High
Illinois